Amarapur, Amarapura or Amarapuram may refer to:

 Several villages in Karnataka, India:
 Amarapur, Belgaum, a village in Bailhongal Taluka, Belgaum District
 Amarapur, Gadag, a village in Shirhatti Taluka, Gadag District
 Amarapur, Koppal, a village in Koppal Taluka, Koppal District
 Amarapur, Raichur, a village in Sindhanur Taluka, Raichur District
 Amarapur Khadehola, a village in Sindhanur Taluka, Raichur District
 Amarapura, Bellary, a village in Bellary Taluka, Bellary District
Other places in India:
 Amarapur, Gujarat, a village in Mansa Taluka of Gandhinagar district, Gujarat
 Amarapuram, Andhra Pradesh, a town and mandal in Anantapur District, Andhra Pradesh
 Amarapuram, Tamil Nadu, a village in Thoothukudi District, Tamil Nadu
Places in Myanmar
 Amarapura, a town and former capital of Burma (Myanmar)
 Amarapura District, a district and township of Mandalay Region.
Bangladesh
 former name for Hulimavu